Euon Brown (born 9 July 1987) is a retired footballer who played as a midfielder. Born in England, he represented the Grenada national team.

International career
Brown appeared for Grenada at the 2009 CONCACAF Gold Cup, making his only appearance in a 4–0 loss to Honduras on 11 July 2009.

Outside football
Brown retired from football in 2012, as injuries halted his career. He worked learning and performance officer, a data analyst, and a principal policy and projects officer. He is currently the Support for Families programme manager for the Troubled Families programme in England.

References

External links
 
 

1987 births
Living people
Footballers from Greater London
Grenadian footballers
Grenada international footballers
English footballers
English sportspeople of Grenadian descent
Association football midfielders
2009 CONCACAF Gold Cup players
Black British sportspeople